Stiol Lake  is a glacial lake situated in the Rodna Mountains, near the city of Borsa, Maramureș County, Romania at a height of 1800 meters, near the Gârgălău Peak (2159 m). The lake is also called Lake Izvorul Bistritei Aurii, because from here springs the Bistrita Lake. The Stiol lake is in Maramures County, at its eastern end.

References

Geography of Maramureș County
Lakes of Romania